Lumut is a coastal town (population 31,880) and mukim in Manjung District, Perak, Malaysia, situated about  from Ipoh,  from the town of Sitiawan and it is the main gateway to Pangkor Island before established Marina Island Pangkor as second gateway. It is noted for seashell and coral handicrafts. This once little-known fishing town has since become the home base of the Royal Malaysian Navy and the site of the biggest naval shipbuilder in Malaysia, Boustead.

Lumut in Malay means moss, lichen, or seaweed. In its early days, the beach was said to be rich in moss, so the local people called it Lumut. Lumut jetty is the staging-off point to offshore islands, including Pangkor Island and Marina Island.

History
Lumut has a sheltered jetty. A large Hock Chew community moved from there to Sitiawan. The estuary was formerly characterized by damp mossy soils on reddish earth. Tin and lumber were transported there by elephants and sampans, from as far away as Kinta. It was once part of the Straits Settlements by virtue of the Pangkor Treaty of 1874 until it was returned to Perak by Great Britain in 1935.

Dockyard
Since 1993, six U.S. Navy warships had been repaired at Lumut's dockyard at a cost of RM 1.6 million.

List of mosques 
 Masjid An-nur Pengkalan TLDM  
 Masjid Khairul Jariah Segari  
 Masjid Al-Adly Pekan Lumut  
 Masjid Sultan Idris Shah  
 Masjid Arfiah Kampung Batu

References

External links

 Perak Government Portal

Manjung District
Mukims of Perak
Towns in Perak